Mostafa Ahmadi (also Romanized as Moştafá Aḩmadī; also known as Moştafá and Tāzehābād-e Aḩmadī ) is a village in Qaleh Shahin Rural District, in the Central District of Sarpol-e Zahab County, Kermanshah Province, Iran. At the 2006 census, its population was 80, in 18 families.

References 

Populated places in Sarpol-e Zahab County